Elis & Tom is a bossa nova album, released in 1974, recorded by Brazilian singer Elis Regina and singer-songwriter Antônio Carlos Jobim.

Recorded over a 16-day period at MGM Studios in Los Angeles, California, the album was an old wish of Regina, who always wanted to record a full album of Jobim's songs with him. This finally came true in 1974, when Elis was celebrating her 10th anniversary as an artist of Philips Records. The label approved the project as a gift for her.

In 2004, the 30th anniversary of the initial release, a remastered special edition was released on DVD Audio which included a 5.1 multi-channel surround mix from the original master tapes.

Reception
The Allmusic review by Thom Jurek awards the album 4.5 stars and states that "This beautiful — and now legendary — recording date between iconic Brazilian vocalist Elis Regina and composer, conductor, and arranger Tom Jobim is widely regarded as one of the greatest Brazilian pop recordings."

It was ranked 11th on Rolling Stone'''s Top 100 Brazilian albums of all time. The album was inducted into the Latin Grammy Hall of Fame in 2007. On September 2012 it was voted by the audience of Radio Eldorado FM, of Estadao.com and of Caderno C2+Música (both the latter belong to newspaper O Estado de S. Paulo'') as the fourth-best Brazilian album ever.

Track listing

Personnel 
Elis Regina - vocals
Antônio Carlos Jobim - vocals (1, 6, 12, 14), piano (4, 6-8, 11-14), arrangement (4), guitar (6)
César Camargo Mariano - piano (1, 2, 5), electric piano (3, 9, 11, 13), arrangements (except 4)
Hélio Delmiro - guitar (1, 3, 9), electric guitar (2, 5, 11)
Oscar Castro-Neves - guitar (1-3, 5, 9, 13)
Luizão Maia - bass (1-3, 5, 9, 11, 13)
Paulo Braga - drums (1-3, 5, 9, 11, 13)
Bill Hitchcock - conductor of string section (1, 6, 8, 10,12)
Hubert Laws and Jerome Richardson - flute (1, 5, 6, 13; uncredited)
Chico Batera - percussion (11)

References

1974 albums
Antônio Carlos Jobim albums
Elis Regina albums
Bossa nova albums
Verve Records albums
Latin Grammy Hall of Fame Award recipients
Philips Records albums